The Women's EuroHockey Indoor Club Cup is an annual indoor hockey club competition organised by the EHF. It is the premier club tournament of Europe for indoor hockey and contested by the women's champions of the eight strongest EHF national associations.

Format
A total of eight teams competes in the EuroHockey Indoor Club Cup, the champions of those nations ranked one to six in the previous year's Cup and the champions of those 2 nations promoted from the previous year's Trophy, the second level.

The eight teams are divided into two groups and play each other once. If a game is won, the winning team receives 5 points. A draw results in both teams receiving 2 points. A loss gives the losing team 1 point unless the losing team lost by 3 or more goals, then they receive 0 points. The top two teams advance to the semi-finals and the bottom two teams will be placed in pool C, the relegation pool. Each team in Pool C will carry forward the result of the match against that other team in their original pool (A or B) who also goes forward with them into Pool C. Each team will play the other 2 teams in Pool C once. The bottom two teams in pool C are relegated.

Summaries

Source

Records and statistics

Performances by club

Performances by nation

See also
Men's EuroHockey Indoor Club Cup
EuroHockey Club Champions Cup (women)
Women's Euro Hockey League

Notes

References

 
EuroHockey Indoor Club Cup Women
EuroHockey Indoor Club Cup Women
EuroHockey Club Cup Women
Multi-national professional sports leagues